The Rush County Courthouse in La Crosse, Kansas was built in 1888.  Located at 715 Elm St., it was listed on the National Register of Historic Places in 1972.

It serves Rush County, Kansas.  It is a two-story brick building, with brick laid in common bond, on a full basement.  It was funded by a $20,000 bond issue voted upon on July 10, 1888.

References

External links

Government buildings on the National Register of Historic Places in Kansas
Romanesque Revival architecture in Kansas
Government buildings completed in 1888
Rush County, Kansas